Fly Guy is a 2002 graphic adventure video game released for Adobe Flash and designed by Trevor van Meter, an illustrator and graphic designer from Greenville, North Carolina.

Gameplay 
Gameplay in Fly Guy is minimal; players control a man with the arrow keys, letting him move left and right and fly up and down. Throughout the world of the game, players can encounter many abstract and nonsensical things, such as a floating monk, a sumo wrestler, and a man tiling bricks to make the sky, revealing a starry backdrop behind them. There are no goals or loss states in the game. When the player ascends high enough, the game ends.

Development
In an interview, van Meter said that he created Fly Guy because he felt that people with jobs wanted to escape, so he built a Flash game around that idea.

Reception
Time magazine listed Fly Guy as one of their favorite websites of 2004, calling it "A delightful bit of interactive flash" and "not a bad place to be". The New York Observer Very Short List called it "whimsical and deceptively simple".

Legacy 
On July 29, 2016, Fly Guy was re-released on mobile platforms, and was available for iOS and Android. The game was rebuilt in GameMaker by Tom Sennett. 

As of 2021, these versions are no longer available.

References

External links
 Fly Guy

2002 video games
Flash games
Video games developed in the United States